The Canon EOS 1300D, known as the Rebel T6 in the Americas or as the Kiss X80 in Japan, is an 18.0 megapixels digital single-lens reflex camera (DSLR) made by Canon. It was announced on March 10, 2016 with a suggested retail price of US$549.00. 

The 1300D is an entry-level DSLR that supersedes the EOS 1200D. A key-added-feature was the introduction of Wi-Fi and near-field connectivity (NFC) for transfer of data to devices such as computers and smartphones.

Features

 18.0 effective megapixel APS-C CMOS sensor
 9 AF points with 1 cross-type point in the center at f/5.6, extra sensitivity at f/2.8 or faster (except when an EF 28-80mm f/2.8-4L USM lens or EF 50mm f/2.5 Compact Macro lens is attached)
 ISO sensitivity 100 – 6400 (expandable to H: 12800)
 95% viewfinder frame coverage with 0.80× magnification
 1080p Full HD video recording at 24p, 25p (25 Hz) and 30p (29.97 Hz) with drop frame timing
 720p HD video recording at 60p (59.94 Hz) and 50p (50 Hz)
 480p ED video recording at 30p and 25p
 3.0 frames per second continuous shooting
 3.0" in 4:3 ratio colour TFT LCD screen
 Low Pass Filter

Differences compared to the 1200D:

 DIGIC 4+ image processor (instead of the DIGIC 4)
 3.0 inch screen with 920.000 dots resolution (the 1200D has 460.000 dots with the same aspect ratio)
 Wi-Fi and NFC connectivity (not on the 1200D)

References

External links

Canon EOS 1300D Product Page at Canon USA

1300D
Live-preview digital cameras
Cameras introduced in 2016